Strassman may refer to:

Karen Strassman, American voice actress
David Strassman, American ventriloquist
Marcia Strassman, American actress
Rick Strassman, American psychedelic researcher
Toni Strassman, American literary agent
Harvey D. Strassman, American psychiatrist
Todd Strassman, bass player for the band What Is This?
Fritz Strassmann, German chemist
19136 Strassmann, asteroid
Strassmann's theorem